Zohreh Lajevardi is an Iranian conservative politician.

In 2020, she was elected to the Parliament of Iran as a representative of Tehran, Rey, Shemiranat and Eslamshahr.

Electoral history

References 

Living people
Front of Islamic Revolution Stability politicians
Year of birth missing (living people)